Lake of the Woods is a mountain lake in Wyoming, located upstream from Grassy Lake along the Ashton-Flagg Ranch road.

Background
The lake lies in Targhee National Forest, between the southern border of Yellowstone National Park and the northern border of Grand Teton National Park. Primary access is from Ashton, Idaho, or Flagg Ranch, Wyoming, in the John D. Rockefeller, Jr. Memorial Parkway.

Boy scout Camp Loll is located on the lake.

References

External links
 Fishingworks.com
 scoutcampsusa.com

Lakes of Wyoming
Lakes of Teton County, Wyoming